Cisterna d'Asti is a comune (municipality) in the Province of Asti in the Italian region Piedmont, located about  southeast of Turin and about  southwest of Asti.

Cisterna d'Asti borders the following municipalities: Canale, Ferrere, Montà, and San Damiano d'Asti.

Demographic evolution

References

Cities and towns in Piedmont
Roero